Beloslav Peak is the peak rising to 1974 m in Doyran Heights, southeast Sentinel Range in Ellsworth Mountains, Antarctica, and surmounting Guerrero Glacier to the southwest and Sikera Valley to the east.

The peak is named after the town of Beloslav in Northeastern Bulgaria.

Location
US mapping in 1961, updated in 1988.

See also
 Mountains in Antarctica

Maps
 Vinson Massif.  Scale 1:250 000 topographic map.  Reston, Virginia: US Geological Survey, 1988.
 Antarctic Digital Database (ADD). Scale 1:250000 topographic map of Antarctica. Scientific Committee on Antarctic Research (SCAR). Since 1993, regularly updated.

Notes

References
 Beloslav Peak. SCAR Composite Antarctic Gazetteer.
 Bulgarian Antarctic Gazetteer. Antarctic Place-names Commission. (details in Bulgarian, basic data in English)

External links
 Beloslav Peak. Copernix satellite image

Ellsworth Mountains
Bulgaria and the Antarctic
Mountains of Ellsworth Land